Teracotona pardalina is a moth in the family Erebidae. It was described by Max Bartel in 1903. It is found in Angola, the Democratic Republic of the Congo, Ivory Coast, Kenya, South Africa, Tanzania and Uganda.

References

Moths described in 1903
Spilosomina